AM is the second studio album by Spanish pop music artist Abraham Mateo. It was released on November 12, 2013, through Sony Music Spain. The album debuted at number six on the Spain's Top 100 albums chart and was listed for 52 weeks.  It was certified Gold in Spain.

AM was recorded in Madrid and Miami and represented a change in Mateo's music style: in addition to ballad songs, it also included pop and electropop music, and Spanglish lyrics.

Mateo rose to popularity with AM'''s first single, "Señorita", released in November 2012. The song, written by Herbie Crichlow and Thomas Troelsen, was listed for 40 weeks on the Spain's Top 50 singles chart, peaked on number three, and was certified Gold in Spain. The music video for "Señorita" was the most trending music video of 2013 on YouTube Spain. The album's second single, "Girlfriend", written by Charlie Mason, Jani Hölli and Gabriel Warmby, was released early October 2013 and debuted within the top fifteen in Spain. The third and last single, "Lánzalo", written by his producer Jacobo Calderón and Mateo himself, was released in March 2014 as a charity single, in support of UNICEF campaign for the children who suffer as a result of the Syrian conflict. The song debuted at number two on the Spain's Top 50 singles chart.

Track listingAM Special Edition includes a remix of "Señorita" and an acoustic version of "Lánzalo" as bonus tracks. It also includes a DVD, featuring a making of and a dance tutorial of Señorita, unreleased footage from his autograph-signing event in Madrid and from his trip to Miami and his performance at the 2013 Premios Juventud Awards. AM'' was sold on iTunes with a remix of "Kill the Lights" as bonus.

Charts

Weekly Charts

Year-end charts

Singles

Certifications

References

2013 albums
Abraham Mateo albums
Sony Music albums